Ma'agalim (lit. Paths) is a national-religious community settlement in southern Israel. Located south of Netivot, it falls under the jurisdiction of Sdot Negev Regional Council.

History
The village was established in 1958 and its name was taken from the Book of Psalms 65:11;
Thou crownest the year with Thy goodness; and Thy paths drop fatness.;

References 

Community settlements
Religious Israeli communities
Populated places established in 1958
1958 establishments in Israel
Populated places in Southern District (Israel)